Ise may refer to:

Places
Ise, Mie, a city in Japan
Ise Grand Shrine, a Shinto shrine located in Ise, Mie
Ise Ekiti, a city in Nigeria
Ise, Norway, a village in Norway
Ise Province, an ancient province of Japan
River Ise, a tributary of the River Nene in Northamptonshire, England
Ise (river), a tributary of the Aller in Lower Saxony, Germany
Ise Bay, a bay in Japan

People with the name
 (born 1988), Japanese actress
, Japanese swimmer
Lady Ise (c. 875–c. 938), a famous poet in ancient Japan
Ise, stylized as ISE, Danish participant in Danish version of The X Factor and Danish female singer

Other uses
The Tales of Ise (Ise monogatari), a collection of Heian period Japanese waka poetry
Ise Nanao, a character in the manga and anime series Bleach
Japanese battleship Ise, a battleship of the Imperial Japanese Navy, named after the province
 JDS Ise (DDH-182), Japanese helicopter carrier
-ise, a suffix also spelled "-ize".

See also
 ISE (disambiguation)

Japanese-language surnames